The Simple Life is the fourth studio album by Norwegian musician Magnet, first released in Norway on 26 March 2007 where it debuted on the Norwegian Albums Chart at #1. The album was subsequently released in the United States on 18 September 2007, and the United Kingdom on 24 March 2008. The album includes a cover of "She's Gone", originally by Bob Marley.

Track listing

Singles
 Lonely No More EP (30 June 2008)
 "Lonely No More" – 3:05
 "Pennydrop" – 3:07
 "1997" – 3:21
 "Selfhelper" – 3:41

References

Magnet (musician) albums
2007 albums